The Korea Music Copyright Association (KOMCA) is a South Korean non-profit copyright collective for musical works, administering public performance and broadcasting rights, and mechanical recording and reproduction rights. Founded in 1964, it is the second collective rights management organization for musical works in Asia, after JASRAC in Japan. It is also one of the largest in Asia, with over 40,000 members. In 2021, it collected  (US$221 million) in licensing fees and distributed ₩256 billion (US$196 million) in royalties to its members.

Copyright owners—including authors, composers, arrangers, and music publishers—can join KOMCA as associate members. Associate members who have "engaged in substantial musical creation" are promoted to full members by the board of directors. These members can attend and vote at the annual general meeting and can be elected to the board of directors. The board consists of 21 members, elected to three-year terms of office.

History
KOMCA was founded by members of the Korea Record Writers Association, a voluntary organization for songwriters. The government then merged the Korea Record Writers Association into the new association's creative division. After the merger, members of the former Korea Record Writers Association felt their rights were not being protected and sought to establish a copyright management organization under the Copyright Act of 1957. KOMCA was founded in March 1964 and was approved by the Ministry of Education on June 19, 1964.

KOMCA became of member of the World Intellectual Property Organization (WIPO) in 1979 and joined CISAC as an associate member in 1987, becoming a full member in 1995. In 2004, KOMCA hosted the 44th CISAC World Congress in Seoul.

Agreement with JASRAC

In December 2007, KOMCA signed a reciprocal representation agreement with the Japanese Society for Rights of Authors, Composers and Publishers (JASRAC), which allows "either society to administer (license, collect and distribute royalties) usage of the other society's repertoire in its own country on behalf of the other society". This was called a "milestone in Japan-Korean musical relations" because Japanese music had been completely banned in South Korea until 1999, and music with Japanese lyrics was not allowed until 2004. In 2012, Korean pop music earned ₩11 billion (US$10 million) in royalties from Japan, about ten percent of what was earned in South Korea that same year. In comparison, ₩137 million (US$126,000) was earned in Hong Kong, ₩130 million (US$120,000) in Taiwan, ₩100 million (US$92,000) in Singapore, and ₩58 million (US$53,000) in the United States.

Establishment of KOSCAP

In October 2014, the Ministry of Culture, Sports and Tourism (MCST) approved the establishment of a new copyright association, the Korean Society of Composers, Authors and Publishers (KOSCAP), in an attempt to "create competition and extend the rights of [music] creators". Before this, KOMCA had had a copyright management monopoly on music for fifty years. The main difference between the two associations is KOSCAP's "selection system", which allows music creators to choose which rights the association will be entrusted with, including transmission, broadcasting and reproduction rights. In contrast, KOMCA members must entrust all their rights to KOMCA.

In April 2015, MCST approved KOSCAP's new copyright royalty distribution system, which treats all types of music equally. Under KOMCA, licensing fees paid by broadcasting stations differ according to the type of music, so fees for using background music are much less than music with lyrics, like K-pop songs. This caused conflict between the two competing organizations, as they both felt the other's distribution system was unfair to songwriters.

Korea Music Copyright Awards
On December 4, 2011, KOMCA held the inaugural Korea Music Copyright Awards at Olympic Hall in Seoul. The awards were created in recognition of individuals working behind the scenes (composers, editors, lyricists etc.) in the music industry. Songwriter Cho Young-soo was the first to be awarded the grand prize for earning the most royalties. Pop genre awards (ballad, dance, rock, hip-hop, and trot) were also given out, as well as awards for Korean classical music and children's songs. As of the 2023 ceremony, Pdogg, long-time producer and composer for boy group BTS, is the most awarded songwriter in this category, having won the grand prize for five consecutive years since 2019.

References

External links
 

Organizations established in 1964
Music organizations based in South Korea
Organizations based in Seoul
1964 establishments in South Korea
Music licensing organizations